The Secretariat Vox Populi Award, also known as the "Voice of the People" award, was established in 2010 by Penny Chenery, who was the owner of Secretariat. The annual award "recognizes the horse whose popularity and racing excellence best resounded with the American public and gained recognition for Thoroughbred racing."

Recipients of the award to date:

, the award was chosen by a combined vote of the general public, conducted online; plus a vote of the Vox Populi committee, and a vote by Chenery. Online voting is then turned over to the general public, who can write in their own choices. Voting closes on November 30, with the winner announced in December.

References

Horse racing awards
Horse racing in the United States
American horse racing awards
Awards established in 2010